KSNF, virtual channel 16 (UHF digital channel 17), is an NBC-affiliated television station licensed to Joplin, Missouri, United States, and also serving Pittsburg, Kansas. The station is owned by Irving, Texas–based Nexstar Media Group, which also operates ABC affiliate KODE-TV (channel 12, also licensed to Joplin) under joint sales and shared services agreements (JSA/SSA) with owner Mission Broadcasting. The two stations share studios on South Cleveland Avenue in Joplin, where KSNF's transmitter is also located.

History

The station first signed on as KUHI-TV (for "Ultra High Frequency") on January 4, 1968, as a CBS affiliate. KUHI was the first station in the Joplin–Pittsburg market to broadcast on the UHF band.

It was originally owned by Marvin Caldwell & Associates. Mid-America Broadcasting sold the station to the owners of the Kansas State Network in 1975. The station changed its call letters to KTVJ ("Television for Joplin") in 1975. On August 23, 1982, the station then changed its call letters to KSNF, and almost two weeks later on September 5, swapped affiliations with KOAM-TV (channel 7) to become an NBC affiliate. The station did limited simulcasting with Wichita NBC affiliate KSNW. KSN then sold KSNF to Price Communications in 1986, but the station continued the partial simulcast with KSNW. It stopped simulcasting KSNW completely after George Lilly (SJL Communications) acquired the KSN stations and, in a cost-cutting effort, cut the microwave links to KSNT and KSNF.

The "KSN" brand had become solidified in the market and continued to be used even though KSNF was no longer a part of the Kansas State Network nor made any references to it, although the KSN stations and KSNF were reunited under the same ownership in 2017 when Nexstar acquired the Kansas State Network stations.

On August 23, 1995, Price sold KSNF and fellow NBC affiliates KJAC-TV in Beaumont, Texas, and KFDX-TV in Wichita Falls, Texas, to Wakefield, Rhode Island-based upstart USA Broadcast Group for $42 million, retaining ABC affiliate WHTM-TV in Harrisburg, Pennsylvania, as its sole television property (USA soon renamed itself to U.S. Broadcast Group after USA Network filed a copyright infringement complaint against the broadcasting company).

On January 12, 1998, Irving-based Nexstar Broadcasting Group acquired KSNF, KFDX-TV, and KBTV-TV from U.S. Broadcast Group for $64.3 million. Its digital signal on channel 46 signed on in 2003.

In 2002, it was announced KSNF and ABC affiliate KODE would merge, with building expansion planned at the KSN studios. Although some departments did in fact move to KSNF, by 2009 the process was not yet completed, leaving the Joplin market as the only one of the several Nexstar-owned duopolies to have failed to completely merge. In June 2008, KSNF began broadcasting NBC high definition programming to digital cable and satellite customers in the Joplin market. At the time, only NBC programming was provided in high definition, while local news and syndicated programs were still in standard definition, pending the upgrade of KSN's production systems and equipment to accommodate high definition content for non-network programming.

On May 8, 2009, severe thunderstorms affected the Joplin area. KSNF's tower was destroyed (falling on the studio and nearby homes) and the studio was heavily damaged. KSNF could not broadcast due to this tower collapse, so viewers could only receive NBC programming from stations airing on the fringes of the viewing area (KSNW, KJRH in Tulsa, and KYTV in Springfield, Missouri). However, several five- to ten-minute news updates were aired on fourstateshomepage.com each day until broadcasting resumed. The station returned to the air on June 17, 2009, as a subchannel of sister station KODE-TV on channel 43.2 (12.2 via PSIP). It constructed a news set inside of the KODE-TV studios where it was temporarily housed. It was made public in February 2010 that both KSNF and KODE would be moving to the remodeled KSNF studios at 1502 Cleveland, just down the road from the current KODE building.

On June 15, 2016, Nexstar announced that it has entered into an affiliation agreement with Katz Broadcasting for the Escape, Laff, Grit, and Bounce TV networks (the last one of which is owned by Bounce Media LLC, whose COO Jonathan Katz is president/CEO of Katz Broadcasting), bringing the four networks to 81 stations owned and/or operated by Nexstar, including KSNF and KODE-TV.

Programming
KSNF currently broadcasts the majority of the NBC schedule, although the station currently does not clear NBC's overnight rerun and lifestyle lineups, preferring to carry some syndicated programming in the designated time period (particularly on early Tuesday through Friday mornings, while early Saturday mornings bring movies). The station does not clear the Sunday edition of Today. Syndicated programs broadcast by KSNF include Maury, The Real,  Rachael Ray, AgDay (which also airs on KFJX), and Jeopardy! (which also airs on sister station KODE). Wheel of Fortune airs on CBS affiliate KOAM-TV, making Joplin–Pittsburg one of only a few markets where the programs are carried on separate stations (normally, both shows air on the same channel back-to-back). Unlike most NBC affiliates, KSNF is one of a few NBC affiliates to carry paid programming on weekdays.

News operation
KSNF presently broadcasts 21½ hours of local newscasts each week (with 4½ hours each weekday and 30 minutes each on Saturdays and Sundays).

While in its role as airing partial simulcasts of KSNW programming, it used the "Hello News" music package until 1990. In November 2005, a graphics and music change took place. As part of the update (and with upcoming digital changes) the "16" was removed from KSN's logo, opens, and all other images, including station vehicles. In the fall of 2010, KSNF debuted the Four State area's first and only hour-long 6 p.m. newscast. In August 2011, KSNF dropped its 5 p.m. newscast in favor of a new, hour-long 4 p.m. lifestyle program called Living Well making that the area's first and only 4 p.m. newscast. (The channel chose to air new episodes of Jeopardy! in its 5 p.m. slot as a lead-in to NBC Nightly News.) On December 19, 2012, KSNF launched its local newscasts in 1080i high definition - and for the first time since the late 90s, re-branded itself as KSN Local News dropping Your Hometown News after 15 years.

Notable former on-air staff
 T. J. Holmes - anchor/reporter; later at CNN; and then with BET Networks and now with ABC's Good Morning America

Subchannels
The station's digital signal is multiplexed:

On February 1, 2021, KSNF-DT4 brought Antenna TV back to the Joplin–Pittsburg market after it was dropped by KPJO-LD on June 3, 2019 in favor of Court TV.

References

External links
 

SNF
NBC network affiliates
Laff (TV network) affiliates
Ion Mystery affiliates
Antenna TV affiliates
Television channels and stations established in 1968
1968 establishments in Missouri
Nexstar Media Group